Anne Nature Reserve is a nature reserve situated in the city of Tartu, Estonia. It is the smallest nature reserve in Estonia.

References

Nature reserves in Estonia
Tartu